Immaculate Conception School, is a Roman Catholic elementary school located in the Roman Catholic Archdiocese of Baltimore in the United States. It is affiliated with Immaculate Conception Parish and located in Towson, MD.

External links

Catholic schools in Maryland
Private schools in Baltimore County, Maryland
Towson, Maryland